The 2009 Grote Prijs Jef Scherens was the 43rd edition of the Grote Prijs Jef Scherens cycle race and was held on 6 September 2009. The race started and finished in Leuven. The race was won by Sebastian Langeveld.

General classification

References

2009
2009 in road cycling
2009 in Belgian sport